Arctia yarrowii, or Yarrow's tiger moth, is a moth of the family Erebidae. It was described by Richard Harper Stretch in 1874. It is found in North America from Hudson Bay to British Columbia and northern Arizona. The habitat consists of barren rocky fellfields and slides above the timberline. These moths are also found in the Pacific Northwest.

The length of the forewings is about 22 mm. The ground color of the forewings is cream to light yellow, with a pattern of broad dark brownish-gray transverse lines. The hindwings are orange marked with dark gray. Adults are on wing from mid-July to mid-August.

The larvae probably feed on various herbaceous plants.

This species was formerly a member of the genus Pararctia, but was moved to Arctia along with the other species of the genera Acerbia, Pararctia, Parasemia, Platarctia, and Platyprepia.

References

Arctiina
Moths described in 1874